1000 North Water Street is a 16-story  post-modern high-rise office building in Milwaukee, in the U.S. state of Wisconsin. It is the twelfth-tallest building in Milwaukee, and was completed in 1991, right at the tail end of a construction boom in Milwaukee that started in the late 1980s, and included 100 East Wisconsin, Northwestern Mutual Tower, and the Milwaukee Center. The facade and windows are a light pink color, giving it a unique appearance among Milwaukee's skyline.

A portion of the building is a parking garage, owned by the City of Milwaukee, with 1,542 parking stalls. The U.S. Department of Homeland Security maintains a private section in the parking garage for storage and investigations.

References

Skyscraper office buildings in Milwaukee
1991 establishments in Wisconsin
Office buildings completed in 1991